Thaumaglossa is a genus of beetles in the family Dermestidae, containing the following species:

 Thaumaglossa americana Jayne, 1882
 Thaumaglossa anthrenoides Pic, 1918
 Thaumaglossa arabuko Háva, 2003
 Thaumaglossa basilewskyi Kalík, 1955
 Thaumaglossa bellissima Háva, 2005
 Thaumaglossa bimaculata Arrow, 1915
 Thaumaglossa boana Háva, 2000
 Thaumaglossa chapadana Háva, Kadej & Casari, 2006
 Thaumaglossa chujoi Ohbayashi, 1982
 Thaumaglossa concavifrons Reitter, 1881
 Thaumaglossa conradti Pic, 1927
 Thaumaglossa dembickyi Háva, 2002
 Thaumaglossa ghana Háva, 2002
 Thaumaglossa herrmanni Háva, 2003
 Thaumaglossa hilleri Reitter, 1881
 Thaumaglossa holubi Háva & Kadej, 2006
 Thaumaglossa horaki Háva, 2003
 Thaumaglossa indiana Veer, Chauhan & Singh, 2004
 Thaumaglossa javana Háva, 2006
 Thaumaglossa jendeki Háva, 2003
 Thaumaglossa laeta Arrow, 1915
 Thaumaglossa libochor Beal, 1952
 Thaumaglossa ludgerschmidti Háva & Herrmann, 2002
 Thaumaglossa mroczkowskii Háva & Kadej, 2005
 Thaumaglossa nigricans MacLeay, 1871
 Thaumaglossa nitidula Arrow, 1915
 Thaumaglossa pauliani Pic in Paulian, 1953
 Thaumaglossa peacockae Háva, 2005
 Thaumaglossa petrstanda Háva, 2003
 Thaumaglossa postlimbata Pic, 1948
 Thaumaglossa pseudohilleri Háva, 2006
 Thaumaglossa purpurea Pic, 1915
 Thaumaglossa pygidialis Pic, 1916
 Thaumaglossa rihai Háva, 2002
 Thaumaglossa rufiventris Pic, 1927
 Thaumaglossa rufocapillata Redtenbacher, 1867
 Thaumaglossa rufocincta Arrow, 1915
 Thaumaglossa rufofasciata Pic, 1915
 Thaumaglossa rufomaculata Pic, 1938
 Thaumaglossa rufula Pic, 1931
 Thaumaglossa tonkinea Pic, 1916
 Thaumaglossa uninotata Pic, 1954
 Thaumaglossa weigeli Háva, 2006
 Thaumaglossa wittmeri Háva, 2006
 Thaumaglossa yeti Háva, 2003

References

Dermestidae